The 1990 Little League World Series took place between August 21 and August 26 in Williamsport, Pennsylvania. The San Hua Little League of Tainan, Taiwan defeated the Shippensburg Little League of Shippensburg, Pennsylvania in the championship game of the 44th Little League World Series. Excessive rain delays resulted in the championship game being rescheduled from August 25 to August 26 (a Sunday), with highlights broadcast on ESPN on tape delay.

Teams

Championship bracket

 The semi-final games were delayed two days, due to rain.
 The championship game was played on a Sunday for the first time in LLWS history, due prior game postponements due to rain.

Position bracket

Notable players
Jason Bay (Trail, British Columbia) – MLB outfielder from 2003 to 2013
Chin-Feng Chen (Tainan, Taiwan) – MLB outfielder from 2002 to 2005 & in the CPBL from 2006 to 2016.

References

External links

Little League World Series
Little League World Series
Little League World Series
Little League World Series